Nistrovo is a village in the municipality of Mavrovo and Rostuša, North Macedonia.

Demographics
Nistrovo is one of the few Upper Reka villages with a resident population in the 2010s. The village consists of two neighbourhoods, one populated by Muslim Albanians with a mosque and the other by Albanian speaking Orthodox Christians, who in the modern period self identify as Macedonians. The Orthodox population for several decades migrated from the village to various urban centres and come back to Nistrovo in the summer. Most homes in the Orthodox neighbourhood are abandoned and the restoration of the Orthodox church occurred in the early 2010s. 

According to the 2002 census, the village had a total of 121 inhabitants. Ethnic groups in the village include:

Albanians 121

As of the 2021 census, Nistrovo had 32 residents with the following ethnic composition:
Albanians 27
Persons for whom data are taken from administrative sources 4
Others 1

References

External links

Villages in Mavrovo and Rostuša Municipality
Albanian communities in North Macedonia